Otis Williams Jr. (born November 23, 1981), better known by his stage name OJ da Juiceman, is an American rapper. OJ da Juiceman was formerly signed to Gucci Mane's 1017 Brick Squad record label. OJ Da Juiceman is also the founder of vanity label 32 Entertainment.

Early life
Otis Williams Jr. was raised by a single mother in East Atlanta, Georgia. During the early 1990s, Williams met Southern rapper Gucci Mane who lived in the same apartment buildings with whom he would later collaborate as OJ da Juiceman. Juiceman began his music career with "Never Again Records", widely known for their 2004 Summer spin-off hit "Black Tee".  Following the creation of his own label 32 Entertainment, he partnered up with Gucci Mane CEO of So Icey Entertainment. OJ released 6 mixtapes under 32 Entertainment and has been featured on many underground mixtapes featuring various artists.

Music career

2006–2010: The Otha Side of the Trap 
OJ da Juiceman was shot eight times on April 4, 2009 and performed a show that same week. The shooting has since left him with a permanent limp. After releasing over a dozen mixtapes hosted by such DJs as DJ Drama, Trap-a-Holics, DJ Holiday, DJ 5150, OJ da Juiceman founded the vanity label 32 Entertainment and signed to the Asylum Records in 2009. OJ's Asylum debut, The Otha Side of the Trap, contained both new tracks and previously released mixtape tracks. The album included the single "I'm Gettin' Money" and another that featured Gucci Mane, "Make tha Trap Say Aye". OJ also appeared on Jadakiss's single "Who's Real" and R. Kelly's "Supaman High" and has a mixtape with DJ Holiday called Alaska in Atlanta.

2010–present: The Otis Williams Jr. Story 
OJ's second album was revealed to be titled The Otis Williams Jr. Story. In 2011 & 2012 OJ released a slew of mixtapes, while he promoted his independent label 32 Entertainment. His most recent mixtape was 6 Ringz 2 (The Playoffs Edition) released on March 2, 2013. The mixtape featured guest appearances from Young Scooter, Gorilla Zoe and others. Production was handled by Lex Luger, Metro Boomin, and 808 Mafia. After getting in a Twitter feud with Gucci Mane in September 2013, OJ Da Juiceman revealed he had never been officially signed to 1017 Brick Squad. On September 20, 2013, OJ da Juiceman revealed that The Otis Williams Jr. Story would be released digitally on November 23, 2013 by 32 Entertainment. On February 11, 2014, OJ da Juiceman released the mixtape "Alaska in Atlanta 2" Hosted by DJ Holiday.

Other ventures

32 Entertainment

32 Entertainment, is an Atlanta, Georgia based record label formed in 2007 by OJ da Juiceman. It is currently operating independently.

Discography 

 The Otha Side of the Trap (2009)
 The Otis Williams Jr. Story (2014)

References

External links
 OJ da Juiceman on Myspace
 OJ da Juiceman on Twitter

1981 births
Living people
1017 Brick Squad artists
African-American businesspeople
African-American male actors
African-American male rappers
African-American songwriters
American music industry executives
American shooting survivors
Asylum Records artists
Businesspeople from Atlanta
Male actors from Atlanta
Rappers from Atlanta
Songwriters from Georgia (U.S. state)
Southern hip hop musicians
Gangsta rappers
21st-century American rappers
21st-century American male musicians
21st-century African-American musicians
20th-century African-American people
American male songwriters